The New Zealand giant sawbelly (Hoplostethus melanopeza) is a slimehead of the order Beryciformes. It is native to the South Pacific, more specifically the sub-tropical and temperate latitudes of the Tasman and South Fiji basins. It is also found along Australia's southeastern coast, the Bay of Plenty, and southern Kermadec Ridge at the north end of New Zealand's North Island. It can reach sizes of up to  SL. The first H. melanopeza caught were thought to be individuals of the H. gigas species, and it was not distinguished as a separate species until much later. One key difference between the two is that although both are red, H. melanopeza has black fin margins.

References

External links
 

Hoplostethus
Fish of the Pacific Ocean
Marine fish of Eastern Australia
Marine fish of New Zealand
Fish described in 2012